Introducing Phonology may refer to:
Introducing Phonology (Odden book), 2005 book by David Odden
Introducing Phonology (Hawkins book), 1984 book by Peter Hawkins